Andrew Hendy was a Hereditary Chief of the Mosquito Reservation.

He was proclaimed by the Nicaraguans on the death of his cousin George V, who died on 8 November 1888. He was repudiated by many people of the Miskitu Nation and abdicated in favour of his cousin Jonathan I, on 8 March 1889. He retired to Nicaraguan territory where he became a Miskitu Jefe Inspector and River Magistrate. He was subsequently chosen as a rival Chief by General Rigoberto Cabezas who deposed Robert Henry Clarence in 1894. He was reappointed for the third time and formally installed at the Government Palace, Bluefields, on 20 November 1894. He was later accepted as chief by his own relatives and others who resided around the Wangki River within traditional Nicaraguan territory, but was opposed by the vast majority, who saw him as a Nicaraguan stooge and rebelled against him in 1896, 1899 and 1900.

References

Miskito people
Native American leaders
Year of birth missing
1914 deaths